Gragnano Trebbiense is a comune (municipality) in the Province of Piacenza in the Italian region, Emilia-Romagna, located about  northwest of Bologna and about  southwest of Piacenza.

The battle of the Trebia was fought in Gragnano's territory in 218 BC.

References

Cities and towns in Emilia-Romagna